Kahit Puso'y Masugatan (Lit: Even If You Break My Heart / English: Hearts on Fire) is a 2012 Philippine melodrama 
television series directed by Wenn V. Deramas, topbilled by Gabby Concepcion, Jake Cuenca, Andi Eigenmann and Iza Calzado. The series aired on ABS-CBN's Primetime Bida evening block and worldwide on The Filipino Channel from July 9, 2012 to February 1, 2013, replacing Pinoy Big Brother: Teen Edition 4.

Series overview

Episodes

July 2012

August 2012

September 2012

October 2012

November/December 2012

January 2013

February 2013

References

Lists of Philippine drama television series episodes